The 1998 season of the Tonga Club Championship was the 20th season of top flight association football competition in Tonga. Lotohaʻapai United won the championship for the first time, beginning the 11 title record streak in the Tonga Major League. Lotohaʻapai United beat Kolofoʻou FC 2-1 in the knockout final.

Standings 
Top 3 teams on the table:
 Lotohaʻapai United
 Vaolongolongo
 Ma'ufanga

References

Tonga Major League seasons
Tonga
Football